Tifozat Kuq e Zi (also known as the Albania National Football Team Supporters Club) is a non-profit football supporters' association for the Albania national football team and various national team sportive activities.  It was founded on December 25, 2003.  In cooperation with FSHF, it organises trips for football fans to visit games, and develops and sells merchandise to support itself and fund sporting related projects.

Tifozat Kuq e Zi stands firm in the political view that Albanians should share only one national team and have continuous aspirations to join in one state (Një Komb, Një Kombëtare), i.e. unification of Albania, Kosovo, etc. In this sense, TKZ is joined by different supporters' associations throughout Albanian-speaking regions mainly in Kosovo (Kuqezinjet e Jakoves of Gjakova, Plisat of Pristina, Torcida of Mitrovica, Shqiponjat of KF Besa Pejë, etc.), North Macedonia (Ballistët of Tetovo, Ilirët of Kumanovo, Shvercerat of Skopje, etc.) and in Albania itself (Ultras Guerrils of Partizani Tirana, Tirona Fanatics of KF Tirana, Vllaznit Ultras of Vllaznia Shkodër and many other different Albanian fans).

The TKZ have been praised by many different football players and managers, whom were not just Albanian. Switzerland's former coach, Ottmar Hitzfeld was astonished by how many Albanian fans turned up and how enthusiastic they were in 2014 FIFA World Cup qualification – UEFA Group E between Switzerland and Albania on 11 September 2012 in Swissporarena, Lucerne, where the Swiss won 2–0 thanks to goals from Gökhan Inler and Kosovo-born Xherdan Shaqiri. He didn't believe that there were 12,000 Albanian fans in the stands which was more than how many Swiss fans turned up for the game. He stated Albanian fans are fantastic and the most passionate fans I have ever seen. During that campaign, TKZ attended all games Albania played apart from a match against Cyprus in Nicosia and were also large in numbers in the away games to Slovenia where Albania lost 1–0 and Norway where Albania won 1–0 thanks to a stunning goal by Hamdi Salihi.

References

External links
Tifozat Kuq e Zi 
Tifozat Kuq e Zi at Facebook 

Albania national football teams
Association football supporters' associations